William Watson (10 November 1881 – 12 February 1926) was an Australian cricketer. He played two first-class matches for New South Wales in 1910/11.

See also
 List of New South Wales representative cricketers

References

External links
 

1881 births
1926 deaths
Australian cricketers
New South Wales cricketers
Cricketers from Newcastle, New South Wales